Richard Elliott Friedman (born May 5, 1946) is a biblical scholar and the Ann and Jay Davis Professor of Jewish Studies at the University of Georgia.

Friedman was born in Rochester, New York. He attended the University of Miami (BA, 1968), the Jewish Theological Seminary (MHL, 1971), and Harvard University (Th.M. in Hebrew Bible, 1974; Th.D. in Hebrew Bible and Near Eastern Languages and Civilizations, 1978). He was the Katzin Professor of Jewish Civilization: Hebrew Bible; Near Eastern Languages and Literature at the University of California, San Diego, from 1994 until 2006, whereupon he joined the faculty of the University of Georgia's Religion Department, where he is currently the Ann and Jay Davis Professor of Jewish Studies. Friedman teaches courses in Hebrew, Bible, and Jewish Studies.

He is a winner of numerous awards and honors, including American Council of Learned Societies Fellow. He was a visiting fellow at the University of Cambridge and the University of Oxford; and a Senior Fellow of the American Schools of Oriental Research in Jerusalem. He participated in the City of David Project archaeological excavations of biblical Jerusalem. In his work Who Wrote the Bible?, he provides an updated analysis of the documentary hypothesis.

Origin of the P and the D source
Friedman is of the view that the P Source of the Bible was composed during the time of Hezekiah.  P for instance “emphasizes centralization of religion: one center, one altar, one Tabernacle, one place of sacrifice. Who was the king who began centralization? King Hezekiah."

According to Friedman, and others who follow the theories of Julius Wellhausen regarding the formation of Israel's religion, P is the work of the Aaronid priesthood.  They are the priests in authority at the central altar – not Moses, not Korah, nor any other Levites.  Only those descended from Aaron can be priests.  Friedman then goes on to say “P always speaks of two distinct groups, the priests and the Levites.  Who was the king who formalized the divisions between priests and Levites?  King Hezekiah."  Chronicles reports explicitly:

“Hezekiah assigned (Hebrew יעמד) the priests and Levites to divisions — each of them according to their duties as priests or Levites.”

Friedman writes that the “Aaronid priesthood that produced P had opponents, Levites who saw Moses and not Aaron as their model. What was the most blatant reminder of Moses' power that was visible in Judah?  The bronze serpent 'Nehushtan'.  According to tradition, stated explicitly in E, Moses had made it.  It had the power to save people from snakebite.  Who was the king who smashed the Nehushtan?  Hezekiah.”

Friedman has also proposed that the prophet Jeremiah, working together with his scribe Baruch, was also the person that is the D-source, the Deuteronomist, who wrote/rewrote the books of Deuteronomy, Joshua, Judges, Samuel and Kings. In his book Who wrote the Bible? he gives supporting evidence pointing towards this identification and also notes that in the Talmud Jeremiah was already seen as the author of the Books of Kings. 
In his view this part of the Bible must be seen as one major theological history, which centers on the covenant between the Jews and Yahweh promising eternal prosperity for Israel but demanding that they should worship only Yahweh. In a long cycle of infidelity-defeat-repentance-forgiveness the Jewish history is written. According to him the history first ended with King Josiah as the ultimate god-fearing king and was later rewritten after the fall of the kingdom in 586 BE, putting the blame on the evil done under Manasseh, writing "No king ever arose like Josiah.... But Yahweh did not turn back from his great fury which burned against Judah over all the things in which Manasseh had angered him" (2 Kings 23:25-26).

On the Exodus 
In his 2017 book The Exodus: How It Happened and Why It Matters, Friedman argues that the Exodus involved only a few thousand people, who left Egypt during the reign of either Pharaoh Ramesses II or his son, Pharaoh Merneptah.

This group later merged with the Israelites, introducing the cult of Yahweh in Caanan, together with the idea of monotheism/monolatry, possibly inspired by the religious reforms of Pharaoh Akhenaten. Once in Israel, Yahweh's cult supplanted the cult of the Caananite god El, and the two gods became one and the same in Israelite religious mentality. This group of migrants would later form the Tribe of Levi.

The name Yahweh, according to Friedman, was probably inspired by the Shasu deity Yhw, whose presence is attested by two Egyptian texts from the time of Pharaos Amenhotep III (14th century BCE) and Ramesses II (13th century BCE).

Friedman also rejects the idea that Jewish monotheism was born during the Babylonian captivity (see Deutero-Isaiah) and argues that the concept of monotheism/monolatry was present in the Israelite people since the 12th century BCE, although for many centuries it met strong resistance from polytheistic sectors of Israel.

The book has received positive blurbs from several biblical scholars and archaeologists like Thomas Römer, Carol Meyers and Thomas E. Levy and from publications like Publishers Weekly, The Christian Century and The Jewish Journal.

Writings

 Richard Elliot Friedman, Who Wrote the Bible?, Harper San Francisco, 1987 (second edition 1997).
Richard Elliot Friedman, The Disappearance of God: A Divine Mystery, Little, Brown and Company, 1995.
 Richard Elliot Friedman, The Hidden Face of God, Harper San Francisco, 1996.
 Richard Elliot Friedman, The Hidden Book in the Bible, Harper San Francisco, 1999.

 Richard Elliot Friedman, Commentary on the Torah, Harper San Francisco, 2003.
 Richard Elliot Friedman, The Bible with Sources Revealed, HarperOne, 2009.

 Richard Elliot Friedman and Shawna Dolansky, The Bible Now, Oxford University Press, 2011.
 Richard Elliot Friedman, The Exodus, HarperOne, 2017.

References

External links

 Richard Elliott Friedman's personal website

Harvard Divinity School alumni
Jewish American academics
Jewish biblical scholars
Living people
Old Testament scholars
University of Georgia faculty
1946 births
Jewish translators of the Bible
20th-century Jewish biblical scholars
21st-century Jewish biblical scholars
Writers about religion and science
21st-century American Jews